The 2010 St Helens Metropolitan Borough Council election took place on 6 May 2010 to elect members of St Helens Metropolitan Borough Council in Merseyside, England. One third of the council was up for election and the Labour Party gained overall control of the council from no overall control.

After the election, the composition of the council was:
Labour 28
Liberal Democrats 15
Conservative 5

Background
Before the election Labour were the largest party with 23 councillors, but the council was run by an alliance between the Liberal Democrats with 19 seats and the Conservatives with 6 seats. Seats were contested in all 16 of the wards at the 2010 election, with Labour needing a 2-seat swing to win a majority on the council.

Election result
Labour gained 5 seats to take control of the council, with 28 councillors. This gave them an 8-seat majority over the Liberal Democrats with 15 seats and the Conservatives with 5 seats. Labour took Bold, Haydock, Moss Bank and Town Centre from the Liberal Democrats, including defeating the Liberal Democrat cabinet member Richard Ferry in Moss Bank. Meanwhile, Labour also gained Windle from the Conservatives.

Following the election Labour's Marie Rimmer became leader of the council for a third time.

Ward results

By-elections between 2010 and 2011

Billinge and Seneley Green
A by-election was held in Billinge and Seneley Green on 14 October 2010 after the death of Labour councillor Richard Ward. The seat was held for Labour by Alison Bacon with a majority of 664 votes over Conservative Elizabeth Black.

Haydock
A by-election was held in Haydock on 2 December 2010 after the death of the longest serving Labour councillor in the country, Jim Caunce. The seat was held for Labour by Anthony Burns with a majority of 694 votes over Liberal Democrat Eric Sheldon.

References

2010 English local elections
May 2010 events in the United Kingdom
2010
2010s in Merseyside